These are the Australian number-one albums of 2003, per the ARIA Charts.

See also
2003 in music
List of number-one singles in Australia in 2003

Notes
Number of number one albums: 9
Longest run at number one (during 2003): Innocent Eyes by Delta Goodrem (27 weeks plus two weeks in 2004; longest run at #1 on the ARIA Albums Chart in the 2000s)

References

2003
Australia albums
2003 in Australian music